Wempy Obure (born December 8, 1989) is an Indonesian footballer that currently plays for Persiram Raja Ampat in the Indonesia Super League.

Club statistics

References

External links

1989 births
Association football goalkeepers
Living people
Indonesian footballers
Papuan sportspeople
Liga 1 (Indonesia) players
Persiram Raja Ampat players